The Eiksund Bridge is a cantilever bridge in Ulstein Municipality in the Sunnmøre region of Møre og Romsdal county, Norway.  The bridge is connected to the Eiksund Tunnel as part of the Eiksund Sambandet which joins several islands in the municipalities of Ulstein, Herøy, Sande, and Hareid to the mainland, without the use of ferries.

The bridge runs from the village of Eiksund on Hareidlandet island to the western part of the island of Eika.

The bridge was finished in 2005, but connections with the Eiksund Tunnel were not available until it officially opened in February 2008.  Until then, only local traffic between Hareidlandet and Eika could use the bridge.

In February 2006, the Mechanical Contractors Association stated that Eiksund Bridge had been built too small, and was dangerous to use, especially in the snow.

See also
List of bridges in Norway
List of bridges in Norway by length

References

External links
Pictures of Eiksundbrua

Bridges in Møre og Romsdal
Cantilever bridges
Bridges completed in 2005
Ulstein